Anderson Oliveira Silva (born 21 November 1997) is a Brazilian professional footballer who plays as a forward for Vitória de Guimarães.

Professional career
On 19 July 2017, Anderson signed with Famalicão. Anderson made his professional debut with Famalicão in a 1-0 LigaPro win over U.D. Oliveirense on 27 August 2017. Anderson scored 9 goals in 30 games as Famalicao finished in second in the LigaPro in 2019, earning promotion to the top flight for their first appearance in 25 years. Anderson began the following season on the bench behind Toni Martínez, a summer signing from West Ham United in England. However, he scored on his top flight debut in a victory over Santa Clara on 10 August on the first weekend of the season. Anderson scored 4 goals off the bench as the club started the season undefeated through seven games and top of the table. This included a pair of goals against Belenenses SAD on 28 September to clinch a 3–1 victory. Anderson was given his first start in the top flight for the club's next game, a meeting with Porto, who were just a point behind Famalicão,  on 27 October. Anderson lasted over an hour before being replaced by fit-again Nicolás Schiappacasse in a 3–0 defeat. He was dropped to the bench for the club's next game four days later, but he scored a goal in their 2–1 victory over Gil Vicente.

On 31 July 2021, Anderson joined Chinese Super League club Beijing Guoan. Anderson left Beijing Guoan after the 2021 season.

On 20 May 2022, Anderson signed with Vitória de Guimarães.

Personal life
He is a twin brother of André Clóvis.

Career statistics
.

References

External links
 

1997 births
Twin sportspeople
Living people
Footballers from São Paulo
Brazilian footballers
Beijing Guoan F.C. players
F.C. Famalicão players
Guarani FC players
Guaratinguetá Futebol players
Chinese Super League players
Primeira Liga players
Liga Portugal 2 players
Campeonato Brasileiro Série C players
Association football forwards
Brazilian expatriate footballers
Brazilian expatriate sportspeople in Portugal
Expatriate footballers in Portugal
Brazilian expatriate sportspeople in China
Expatriate footballers in China